The 2021 CRC Brakleen 150 was the 13th stock car race of the 2021 NASCAR Camping World Truck Series season and the 12th iteration of the event. The race was held on Saturday, June 26, 2021 in Long Pond, Pennsylvania at Pocono Raceway, a  permanent triangular racetrack. The race took 60 laps to complete. John Hunter Nemechek of Kyle Busch Motorsports would be able to hold off his boss Kyle Busch to win his 5th win of the season and 11th ever career win in the NASCAR Camping World Truck Series. Kyle Busch, driving for his own team Kyle Busch Motorsports and Sheldon Creed of GMS Racing would score the rest of the podium positions, scoring 2nd and 3rd, respectively.

Background

Entry list 

*Withdrew due to unknown reasons.

Starting lineup 
Qualifying was set by a metric qualifying system based on the previous race, the 2021 Rackley Roofing 200 and owner's points. As a result, Todd Gilliland of Front Row Motorsports would win the pole.

Race results 
Stage 1 Laps: 15

Stage 2 Laps: 15

Stage 3 Laps: 30

References 

2021 NASCAR Camping World Truck Series
NASCAR races at Pocono Raceway
CRC Brakleen 150
CRC Brakleen 150